Voinovka is a rural locality (a village) in Beloozersky Selsoviet, Gafuriysky District, Bashkortostan, Russia. The population was 108 as of 2010. There are 2 streets.

Geography 
Voinovka is located 27 km northwest of Krasnousolsky (the district's administrative centre) by road. Lugovaya is the nearest rural locality.

References 

Rural localities in Gafuriysky District